Eric Tradd Schneiderman (born December 31, 1954) is an American lawyer and politician who served as the 65th Attorney General of New York from 2011 until his resignation in May 2018. Schneiderman, a member of the Democratic Party, spent ten years in the New York State Senate before being elected Attorney General. In May 2018, Schneiderman resigned his position as Attorney General after The New Yorker reported that four women had accused him of physical abuse. In 2021, Schneiderman’s law license was suspended for a year after a disciplinary proceeding where he admitted to the abusive conduct.

Life and early career

Schneiderman was born to a Jewish family in New York City, the son of Abigail Heyward and Irwin Schneiderman, a lawyer. He graduated from the Trinity School in New York City in 1972 and Amherst College in 1977. He earned his Juris Doctor from Harvard Law School in 1982.

Schneiderman served as a judicial clerk for two years within the U.S. District Court for the Southern District of New York and subsequently joined the international law firm Kirkpatrick and Lockhart LLP (now known as K&L Gates), where he became a partner. Schneiderman married Jennifer Cunningham in 1990. They later divorced in 1996. They have a daughter, Catherine, who is married to Matthew Newton.

New York Senate
Schneiderman was elected to represent the 31st district in the New York State Senate. At the time, this district comprised Manhattan's Upper West Side, as well as Morningside Heights, West Harlem, Washington Heights, Inwood, and Marble Hill, in addition to part of Riverdale in the Bronx.

Elections
In the 1998 Democratic primary, Schneiderman, defeated Daniel O'Donnell, a civil rights attorney, with 68% of the vote. In the general election, he defeated Vincent McGowen with 82% of the vote. He won re-election in 2000 (84%), in 2002 (87%), 2004 (89%), 2006 (92%), and 2008 (90%).

Tenure
Schneiderman was the chief sponsor of the Rockefeller Drug Law reforms, which were passed and signed into law in 2009. The reforms included reducing reliance on long, mandatory minimum sentences, and allocating funds for alternatives to incarceration, focusing on treatment and reentry of prisoners into society. His other legislative activities include passing ethics reforms  to root out fraud against taxpayers.

Attorney General

Elections

Schneiderman was the Democratic Party nominee for New York Attorney General. He denied being involved in a hit-and-run automobile accident in July 2010.  He defeated Nassau County District Attorney Kathleen Rice and three other candidates in the Democratic primary on September 14, 2010. Schneiderman defeated Republican nominee and Richmond County District Attorney Dan Donovan in the general election and took office on January 1, 2011.

Schneiderman won re-election in 2014. His major opponent was Republican John P. Cahill, who had been an environmental conservation commissioner for the state.

Tenure
Schneiderman was instrumental in pushing for a tougher fraud settlement with large banks over illegal foreclosure practices. Along with California Attorney General Kamala Harris, Schneiderman pushed to prevent the settlement from including immunity for the banks from further investigation and prosecution of other related illegal activities.

In 2011, Melissa DeRosa, who was later the Secretary to New York Governor Andrew Cuomo, became deputy chief of staff and acting chief of staff for Schneiderman.

In August 2013, Schneiderman filed a $40 million civil lawsuit against Donald Trump for his "Trump University" (now known as Trump Entrepreneur Initiative), alleging it to be an "unlicensed university" and calling it a "bait-and-switch scheme".  Trump denied all accusations, calling Schneiderman a "political hack". In October 2014, a New York judge found Trump personally liable for the institution's not having the required license.

In September 2013, Schneiderman announced a settlement with 19 companies to prevent astroturfing; i.e., buying fake online praise.  "'Astroturfing' is the 21st century's version of false advertising, and prosecutors have many tools at their disposal to put an end to it," according to Schneiderman. The companies paid $350,000 to settle the matter, but the settlement opened the way for private suits as well. "Every state has some version of the statutes New York used," according to lawyer Kelly H. Kolb. "What the New York attorney general has done is, perhaps, to have given private lawyers a road map to file suit."

Schneiderman and Manhattan District Attorney Cyrus Vance Jr. were sued in 2015 in a constitutional challenge to New York's 1997 ban on mixed martial arts. The following year, the New York State Legislature legalized MMA in the state.

In November 2015, Schneiderman issued cease-and-desist letters to daily fantasy sports companies DraftKings and FanDuel, accusing the companies of operating a gambling enterprise that is illegal under New York law. This sparked a six-month-long legal battle. Schneiderman reached a settlement with the companies in March 2016, under which DraftKings and FanDuel agreed to stop operating in New York until September 2016 and Schneiderman agreed to drop all of the state's suits against DraftKings and FanDuel—except for a false advertising claim against FanDuel—if the New York State Legislature passed legislation legalizing daily fantasy sports by the adjournment of the session.

In 2017, during President Donald Trump's first year in office, the Trump administration sought to scrap numerous Obama-era environmental regulations that Trump viewed as an impediment to business. Schneiderman filed over 50 lawsuits opposing Trump's environmental actions.

In February 2018, Schneiderman brought a civil rights lawsuit against The Weinstein Company, alleging the company "repeatedly broke New York law by failing to protect its employees from pervasive sexual harassment, intimidation, and discrimination". The lawsuit delayed the sale of The Weinstein Company with the Attorney General adding, "Any sale of the Weinstein Company must ensure that victims will be compensated."

Allegations of abuse and resignation

On May 7, 2018, Jane Mayer and Ronan Farrow reported in The New Yorker  that Schneiderman had physically abused at least four women during his tenure as Attorney General. According to the report, Schneiderman had, between about 2013 and 2016, committed acts of violence against three romantic partners (blogger and activist Michelle Manning Barish, author and actress Tanya Selvaratnam, and a third woman), as well as an unnamed female attorney. The women said that Schneiderman had choked, hit or violently slapped them, all without their consent. Selvaratnam added that Schneiderman spat on her, choked her, called her his "brown slave," ordered her to call him "Master" and say that she was "his property," and demanded that she find another woman who would be willing to engage in a ménage à trois. Both Selvaratnam and Barish alleged that Schneiderman engaged in a pattern of alcohol abuse, and that he had threatened to kill them if they ended their respective relationships with him. Mayer and Farrow reported that they confirmed the women's allegations with photographs of wounds and bruises, as well as with statements from friends in whom the women had confided after the assaults.

In his initial response to the allegations, Schneiderman said: "In the privacy of intimate relationships, I have engaged in role-playing and other consensual sexual activity. I have not assaulted anyone. I have never engaged in nonconsensual sex, which is a line I would not cross." Three hours after the article was published in The New Yorker, Schneiderman announced his resignation effective the next day. In a statement, he said that he "strongly contested" the allegations, but resigned because they would "effectively prevent" him from performing the duties of his office. He did not seek re-election. Schneiderman's deputy, Solicitor General Barbara Underwood, was appointed to replace him as Attorney General.

Governor Andrew Cuomo assigned Nassau County District Attorney Madeline Singas as a special prosecutor to investigate possible criminal charges against Schneiderman. On November 8, 2018, Singas announced that Schneiderman would not be prosecuted. Singas stated that she believed the allegations made by Schneiderman's accusers, but added that "legal impediments, including statutes of limitations, preclude criminal prosecution." In response, Schneiderman stated, "I recognize that District Attorney Singas' decision not to prosecute does not mean I have done nothing wrong. I accept full responsibility for my conduct in my relationships with my accusers, and for the impact it had on them." Schneiderman further stated that he was "committed to a lifelong path of recovery and making amends" and apologized for the pain he had caused.

In 2019, Schneiderman had completed a class on becoming a meditation teacher.

Electoral history

*McGowan was also listed on the Liberal Party line; Brance was also listed on the Right to Life Party line.

*Schneiderman was also listed on the Working Families Party line; Madon was also listed on the Independence Party line.

*Schneiderman was also listed on the Working Families Party line.

*Schneiderman was also listed on the Working Families Party line.

*Schneiderman was also listed on the Working Families Party line.

*Schneiderman was also listed on the Working Families Party line.

*Schneiderman was also listed on the Independence Party and Working Families Party line; Donovan was also listed on the Conservative Party line.

*Schneiderman was also listed on the Independence Party, Working Families Party, and Women's Equality Party lines; Cahill was also listed on the Conservative Party and Stop Common Core Party lines.

References

Further reading
Paterson, David "Black, Blind, & In Charge: A Story of Visionary Leadership and Overcoming Adversity." New York, New York, 2020

External links
 Official NY Attorney General Website
 Eric Schneiderman for Attorney General  Official campaign website
 Eric Tradd Schneiderman listing from New York State Unified Court System
 Disciplinary case https://iapps.courts.state.ny.us/attorneyservices/wicket/page?4-1.-historyPanel-wmcDisciplinaryHistory-disciplinaryHistory-0-CourtDecisionsSearchPage

|-

|-

|-

|-

1954 births
Politicians from New York City
21st-century American politicians
Jewish American state legislators in New York (state)
Trinity School (New York City) alumni
Amherst College alumni
Harvard Law School alumni
Democratic Party New York (state) state senators
New York State Attorneys General
2012 United States presidential electors
2016 United States presidential electors
Lawyers from New York City
People from Berkshire County, Massachusetts
Living people
21st-century American Jews